Jerai may refer to:
Mount Jerai
Jerai (federal constituency), represented in the Dewan Rakyat
Jerai (state constituency), formerly represented in the Kedah State Council (1955–59)